is a passenger railway station located in the city of Takamatsu, Kagawa, Japan.  It is operated by the private transportation company Takamatsu-Kotohira Electric Railroad (Kotoden) and is designated station "S13".

Lines
Fusazaki Station is a station of the Kotoden Shido Line and is located 10.6 km from the terminus of the line at Kawaramachi Station].

Layout
The station consists of one side platform serving a single bi-directional track. It is in the middle of a sharp curve, and the platform also turns sharply to the left toward Kotoden Shido. It used to be a structure with two opposite platforms on two sides, and the remains of the platform remain on the north side. The station is unattended.

Adjacent stations

History
Fusazaki Station opened on November 18, 1911 on the Tosan Electric Tramway. It became a station of the Sanuki Electric Railway in 1942. On November 1, 1943 it became a station on the Takamatsu-Kotohira Electric Railway. Operations were suspended on January 26, 1945 from Yakuri Station to this station, but were reopened on October 9, 1949.

Passenger statistics

Surrounding area
Japan National Route 11

See also
 List of railway stations in Japan

References

External links

  

Railway stations in Japan opened in 1911
Railway stations in Takamatsu